Dubai Investment Fund (DIF) is an independent international asset and investment management company headquartered in Dubai, United Arab Emirates.

As of August 2022, the company held more than $320 billion assets under management, making it one of the largest investment firms in the United Arab Emirates and MENA region.

DIF operates in 20 countries, providing financial services to corporate clients, enterprises and government agencies located in 61 countries. The company is currently headed by Amir Shams who is the incumbent managing director and chief executive officer (CEO) of the company.

History
Dubai Investment Fund was founded in 2001 with the main office in Dubai, UAE. Over the years, the company has built stakes in electronics, financial, renewable energy, oil and gas, and information technology sector companies. In 2002, DIF made its first investment and built a stake in companies such as Statoil and Petrobras.

In 2003, the fund made an investment in a German renewable energy company, Energiekontor, by acquiring a number of shares. Energikontor specializes in setting up wind and solar projects and is also doing operation and maintenance (O&M) of these projects. In the same year, they made another investment by acquiring the shares of a publicly held power equipment manufacturer, Dongfang Electric.
In 2003 the company appointed Mohammed Al-Rashid as the chief investment officer (CIO) of the fund.

In 2004 DIF invested in social projects such as Education for All, Helping Hand, and Technology for Teaching. In the following year, they invested in another social project called GLANA WaterWise. The same year, the company also established its social projects division with Mohammed Al Balushi as its head.

Between 2005 and 2006, DIF continued its acquisition spree and made investments in two holding companies namely, SunTech Power Holdings and SolarFun Power Holdings.

In 2006 DIF made an investment in information technology (IT) sector, when they acquired a stake in Amazon, Google, Sony, and Nvidia. In the following year, they invested in cloud computing sector and acquired a percentage of shares in Adobe, Salesforce, and SAP and an additional investment in Cisco. The fund also made investments in shares of electronics industry company, TSMC.

In 2006, Innovation Investment Department was established and is now headed by Richard Malone.

In 2008 DIF made three appointments and made Mohammed Basma the head of strategic investment, Arthur McKinsey the head of digital innovation and technology, and Jason Williams the CFO and head of finance.

In 2010 DIF acquired a stake in a solar panel manufacturer, JinkoSolar. They made further investments in China Construction Bank, Tencent, and Samsung in 2011.

In 2014 the fund acquired a stake in another publicly traded renewable company, Brookfield Renewable Partners along with the acquisition of shares in a major steel producer, ArcelorMittal. In the following year, DIF added Northland Power, SolarEdge, and Sunrun to their portfolio. The fund also invested in Facebook during the same year.

In 2016 DIF invested in China Steel Corp. From 2016 to 2017, the fund further made investments in IT sector by acquiring stake in publicly listed companies such as AutoDesk, Booking Holdings, Qualcomm, Intuit, VMware, and PayPal.

In 2020 DIF continued their acquisition spree and invested in Dell Inc, Shopify, and HP Inc.

In 2021 it was reported that their total assets increased to more than $320 billion.

In July 2022 Eustace Osborn was made the head of the ESG Investment Department.

In August 2022 it was announced that DIF will invest in a 600 MW wind power project which is located in North Africa. Several sources estimate that this investment will be one of the largest in the wind energy sector in the North African region in 2022. In the same year, they established another department related to environmental, social, and governance.

By mid-2022 DIF had offices in 20 countries across several regions with over 7300 customers spread out over 61 countries.

In September 2022 DIF decided to invest in a Niobium mining project, named Ignitica Minerals, in Brazil and Nigeria. The project will become operational in 2025 and in which the company will invest $430 million over a period of five years. In the same month, it was announced that DIF will invest in two Australia-based startups and the projects would generate about 300W. Previously, the fund announced that it is investing in three projects in Europe.

DIF is also a sponsor of a conference called Innovation and Climate Change.

Operations and offices
Headquartered in Dubai, the company has a presence in London, England; Sydney; Mumbai, India; Tokyo, Japan; New York, United States; Frankfurt, Germany; Zurich, Switzerland; Quebec, Canada; Jakarta, Indonesia; Seoul, South Korea; Milan, Italy; Barcelona, Spain; Shanghai, China; Hong Kong, Singapore, and Luxembourg. In 2022, the company opened three new offices in Prague, Czech Republic; Nicosia, Cyprus; and Wellington, New Zealand, so the total number of countries served by the company has grown to twenty.

References

2001 establishments in the United Arab Emirates
Companies based in Dubai
Companies established in 2001
Investment companies of the United Arab Emirates